NPVE Jelas Expressway  is an expressway being planned in Malaysia. "Jelas" stands for "Jelapang–Selama–Batu Kawan Expressway". This RM4.6 billion project will begin its construction in 2016 and is targeted for completion in 2018. It is being built to relieve congestion on North–South Expressway Northern Route, especially during weekends and festivals seasons.

Beta Mutiara Corporation (BMC), the concessionary holder of the expressway announced that it will begin the preliminary work on the expressway in January 2016.

It will have the longest road tunnel in Asia, about 3 kilometres long across the Bintang Range.

List of interchanges

References

Expressways in Malaysia